Mieczysław Jan Gębarowicz (17 December 1893 – 18 February 1984) was a Polish art historian, soldier, dissident, museum director and custodian of cultural heritage.

Early years
Gębarowicz was born in Jarosław, one of three sons in a patriotic Polish family. His mother was Bronisława, née Smolek. His father, Teofil, was a railway engineer who served as assistant station master in Stanisławów and later as station master in Buczacz. In 1912 he completed his schooling at Buczacz Lyceum and was already a member of two youth organisations, "Zet" and "Zarzewie". He went on to study History and the History of Art at Lwów University. His studies were interrupted by the outbreak of World War I when he served in the ranks of the Austro-Hungarian Army (1915–1918). At the end of that conflict he took part in the Defence of Lwów with Polish forces during the Polish–Ukrainian War, after which he was able to graduate.

Between 1920 and 1922 he was a lecturer in the History faculty of Jan Kazimierz University in a newly independent Poland. In 1921 he was awarded a doctoral degree at the university. In 1922 he took up a post in the National Ossoliński Institute, known as the "Ossolineum" in Lwów, where the following year, he was promoted to curator of the Lubomirski Museum. He continued with academic duties and undertook research and lecturing assignments in Italy, France. Belgium, Spain, Germany, Austria and Czechoslovakia. In 1928 he became an Assistant professor in the History of Art the Department of Humanities at the university. In 1936 he became Honorary professor at Jan Kazimierz University. Between 1923 and 1938 he also lectured in Art History in the faculty of Architecture at Lwów Polytechnic.

World War II
After the outbreak of the war and the sudden death on 18 September 1939 of Ludwik Bernacki, the director of the Ossolineum, Gębarowicz found himself alongside Kazimierz Tyszkowski and Władysław Wisłocki, one of three directors of the Institute. In December 1939 the Soviet authorities had inserted as director, their Polish Communist place-man, Jerzy Borejsza.

Following the German occupation of Lwów in 1941 and the murder, in unexplained circumstances, of Władysław Wisłocki who had been lead director of the Institute, the patron of the institute now allied with the Baworowscy Library, prince Andrzej Lubomirski, covertly nominated Gębarowski as lead director of the institute. Throughout this period until the return in July 1944 of the Soviet occupiers, Gębarowicz strove to safeguard the priceless collections of the Ossolineum. In 1944 still under German occupation, he arranged secretly to despatch with a Kraków-bound German train consignment, 2,300 literary manuscripts. These included works by Juliusz Słowacki, Aleksander Fredro, Władysław Reymont, Henryk Sienkiewicz and Adam Mickiewicz's original of Pan Tadeusz.  In addition there were 2,400 Polish works on paper, prints and several hundred numismatic items which would later become the nucleus of the relocated Ossolineum in Wrocław. Gębarowicz decided to remain in Lwow when the renewed occupation began.

Post-war

1946 saw Gębarowicz become deputy manager of the Faculty of Theory and History of Art of the renamed Ivan Franko National University of Lviv. Thanks to his efforts, in July 1946 as "a gift of the Soviet People to the People of Poland" a further 7,083 manuscripts, 35,565 antiquarian books and 107,397 prints from the 19th and 20th centuries arrived in Wrocław. In March 1947 a further 67,000 books followed. His decision to stay in the city as custodian of the remaining Polish heritage in Lwów was conditional on his accepting Soviet citizenship and rejecting not only the offer to become director of the National Museum in Krakow, but also the offers of professorships at the Universities of Wroclaw and Toruń.

Along with other long-term employees of the Library, in February 1950 he was dismissed on the grounds of being an "undesirable element". He was later able to find work as a librarian in various Lviv institutions that recognised his status as that of a "junior researcher". He first travelled to the Polish People's Republic in 1957 and declined an offer to become director of the Ossolineum in Wrocław. Not until 1962, when he was aged 69, did the Soviet authorities offer him advancement to "senior researcher". Later that year he was forced into retirement as a probable reprisal for the publication in Poland of his "Study of the history of the arts in Late Renaissance Poland". An additional punishment was to bar him from access to the archives in his erstwhile national collection.

Nevertheless, Poland awarded him a medal in 1970 for developing the National Ossoliński Institute. In 1981 the Historical Institute of the Polish Academy of Sciences commissioned him to write an autobiography as part of a compendium of biographies of leading Polish academics. The Polish authorities balked at his completed manuscript and it could only be published a year later by a small Catholic publisher, ZNAK. He was the author of a considerable number of research papers despite his straitened circumstances and no access to the Ossolineum sources. Two well received studies on the art of the Ukraine and of Lwów were published posthumously: his The oldest iconostasis of the volosian orthodox church in Lwów (Wrocław 2016) and Mater Misericordiae - Pokrow - Pokrowa in the art and legends of East-Central Europe (Wrocław 1986).

Gębarowicz died in Lviv in 1984 and was buried at Lyczakow cemetery in the city. He was remembered as the "Pope of the Polish diaspora" in Lwów. A lecture hall in the National Ossoliński Institute is named in his honour.

Works

In Polish
 . Znak 5. 1982 
 . Mieczysław Gębarowicz i Kazimierz Tyszkowski. Lwów: Zakład Narodowy imienia Ossolińskich, 1926
 . Toruń: Towarzystwo Naukowe, 1962
  [Wyd. 1.] Toruń, 1966
 . Lwów: Zakład Norodowy im. Ossolińskich, 1939
 . Polska Akademia Nauk, Instytut Sztuki Wrocław : Zakład Narodowy im. Ossolińskich, 1981
 . [Wyd. 1.] / Wrocław: Zakład Norodowy im. Ossolińskich, 1965
  Lwów: [s.n.], 1923
 . Ed. opracowali Stanisław Jan Gąsiorowski, Mieczysław Gębarowicz, Tadeusz Szydłowski, Władysław Tatarkiewicz, Jan Zarnowski, Józef Zurowski... Lwów, Wydawnictwo zakładu narodowego imienia Ossolińskich 1934. 3 vol. in-4°, fig., pl., carte
 . Polska Akademia Nauk, Instytut Sztuki. Wrocław [etc.] Zakład Narodowy im. Ossolińskich 1981 Wroc WDNSK
 . Toruń Towarzystwo naukowe 1962
 . Towarzystwo miłośników historii i zabytków Krakowa. opracowali Mieczysław Ge̡barowicz i Tadeusz Mańkowski. Kraków Ossolineum 1937
  Toruń Towarzystwo naukowe 1966
 . Kraków: Znak 1980.
 . Wrocław, Warszawa, Kraków: Zakład narodowy imienia Ossolińskich, wyd. Polskiej Akademii nauk 1969
 . Wrocław: Zakład narodowy im. Ossolińskich 1986

In German
 .  Hrsg. von M. Gebarowicz und Hans Tietze. Wien: A. Schroll & co., 1929
 . (Aus: Das polnische Schlesien). Kattowitz: [s.n.], 1935

Legacy
Aside from his scholarly work, it is probably due to his leadership, determination and guile in wartime, the Occupation of Poland (1939–1945), during the Fourth Partition and after, that a major part of Polish cultural heritage survived and was made available to succeeding generations. Largely owed to his initiative are:

 The National Ossoliński Institute and its associated archival and publishing facilities
 The Lubomirski Museum
 The Pan Tadeusz Museum in Wrocław.

See also
 List of Poles
 Roman Aftanazy

References

Bibliography
 Maciej Matwijów, Mieczysław Gębarowicz 1893-1984, Wydawnictwo DiG, 2013. .
 Stanisław Nicieja, "Papież Polonii lwowskiej"  Przegląd Humanistyczny., nr 12. 1987
 Witold Szolginia. 1997 Tamten Lwów. Arcylwowianie. Wrocław: Oficyna Wydawnicza "Sudety"
 „Czasopismo ZNiO” nr 4/1994 artykuły opublikowane w poświęconym w całości M. Gębarowiczowi 
 Mariusz Urbanek, Mieczysław Gębarowicz. Strażnik polskich skarbów Ossolineum we Lwowie, Gazeta Wyborcza, 16 March 2018
 
 
 Robert Bogdanowicz, "Przedwojenny profesor ze Lwowa" (in Polish) A portrait of Mieczysław Gębarowicz (TVP) Tygodnik, 23 February 2018 with video clips and illustrations

External links
 Piotr Czartoryski-Sziler - Mieczysław Gębarowicz - strażnik dóbr narodowych, in Polish
 professor Mieczysław Gębarowicz's role in rescuing collections of Polish heritage in Lwów, in Polish
 Mistrz i nauczyciel - A student's memoir of professor Gębarowicz, in Polish

1893 births
1984 deaths
Polish male writers
20th-century Polish historians
Polish male non-fiction writers
Polish art historians
Polish bibliographers
People from Ternopil Oblast
People from the Kingdom of Galicia and Lodomeria
Austro-Hungarian military personnel of World War I
Polish Military Organisation members
Polish people of World War I
Polish people of the Polish–Ukrainian War
University of Lviv alumni
Academic staff of the University of Lviv
Polish librarians
20th-century Polish male writers
Cultural historians
European art curators
Polish art critics
Directors of museums in Poland
Polish publicists
Ukrainian archivists
Burials at Lychakiv Cemetery
Polish curators